Senator Daly may refer to:

Bernard Daly (1858–1920), Oregon State Senate
James Daly (New York City) (1844–1892), New York State Senate
John B. Daly (New York politician) (1929–1999), New York State Senate
William Davis Daly (1851–1900), New Jersey State Senate

See also
Senator Daley (disambiguation)